Events from the year 1896 in the United States.

Incumbents

Federal Government 
 President: Grover Cleveland (D-New York)
 Vice President: Adlai E. Stevenson I (D-Illinois)
 Chief Justice: Melville Fuller (Illinois)
 Speaker of the House of Representatives: Thomas Brackett Reed (R-Maine)
 Congress: 54th

Events

January–March
 January 4 – Utah is admitted as the 45th U.S. state (see History of Utah).
 February 6 – August 12 – Yaqui Uprising in Arizona and Mexico.
 March 23 – The New York State Legislature passes the Raines Law, restricting Sunday alcoholic beverage sales to hotels.

April–June
 April 9 – The National Farm School (later Delaware Valley College) is chartered in Doylestown, Pennsylvania.
 May 18 – Plessy v. Ferguson: The U.S. Supreme Court introduces the "separate but equal" doctrine and upholds racial segregation.
 May 26 – Eleven years after its foundation, a group of 12 purely industrial stocks are chosen to form the Dow Jones Industrial Average. The index is composed entirely of industrial shares for the first time.
 May 27 – 1896 St. Louis–East St. Louis tornado: The costliest and third deadliest tornado in U.S. history levels a mile wide swath of downtown St. Louis, Missouri, incurring over $10,000,000 in damages at contemporaneous prices, killing more than 255 and injuring over 1,000 people.
 June 4 – The Ford Quadricycle, the first Ford vehicle ever developed, is completed, eventually leading Henry Ford to build the empire that "put America on wheels".
 June 28 – Twin Shaft Disaster: An explosion in the Newton Coal Company's Twin Shaft Mine in Pittston City, Pennsylvania results in a massive cave-in that kills 58 coal miners.

July–September
 July 9 – William Jennings Bryan delivers his Cross of Gold speech at the Democratic National Convention, which nominates him for President of the United States.
 July 32 – Shortly after 6:30 pm, at a crossing just west of Atlantic City, New Jersey, two trains collide, crushing five loaded passenger coaches, killing 50 and seriously injuring approximately 60, in the 1896 Atlantic City rail crash.
 September 15 – The Crash at Crush train wreck stunt is held in Texas.

October–December
 October 30 – Augusta, Kentucky: The Augusta High School cornerstone is laid, marking the end of the Augusta Methodist College.
 November 3 – U.S. presidential election, 1896: Republican William McKinley defeats William Jennings Bryan. This is later regarded as a realigning election, starting the Fourth Party System in which Republicans dominate politics until 1913.
 November 30 – The St. Augustine Monster, a large carcass later postulated to be the remains of a gigantic octopus, is found washed ashore near St. Augustine, Florida.
 December 7 – The 54th United States Congress began its second session.
 December 25 – John Philip Sousa composes his magnum opus, the "Stars and Stripes Forever".

Undated
 The New York Telephone Company is formed.

Ongoing
 Gilded Age (1869–c. 1896)
 Gay Nineties (1890–1899)
 Progressive Era (1890s–1920s)

Births 
 January 4 – Everett Dirksen, U.S. Senator from Illinois from 1951 to 1969 (died 1969)
 January 8 – Arthur Ford, psychic, founded the Spiritual Frontiers Fellowship (died 1971)
 January 14 – John Dos Passos, novelist (died 1970)
 January 18 – C. M. Eddy, Jr., author (died 1967) 
 January 20 – George Burns, actor and singer (died 1996)
 January 21 – J. Carrol Naish, actor (died 1973)
 January 31 – Olive Carey, actress (died 1988)  
 February 7 – Bonner Fellers, United States Army general (died 1973)  
 February 21 – Homa J. Porter, Texas businessman and political activist (died 1986)  
 February 25 – John Little McClellan, U.S. Senator from Arkansas from 1943 to 1977 (died 1977)
 February 28 – Philip Showalter Hench, physician, recipient of the Nobel Prize in Physiology or Medicine in 1950 (died 1965)
 February 29 – William A. Wellman, film director (died 1975)
 March 1 – Harry Winston, diamond dealer (died 1978)
 March 23 – Edwin Eugene Aldrin, aviator and army colonel (died 1974)  
 April 8 – Yip Harburg, lyricist (died 1981)
 April 26 – Edward John Thye, 26th Governor of Minnesota from 1943 to 1947 and U.S. Senator from Minnesota from 1947 to 1959 (died 1969)
 May 30 – Howard Hawks, film director (died 1977)
 June 7
 Douglas Campbell, World War I flying ace (died 1990)
 Robert S. Mulliken, physicist, recipient of the Nobel Prize in Chemistry in 1966 (died 1986)
 Hope Summers, screen character actress (died 1979)
 June 19 – Bessie Wallis Warfield, later Duchess of Windsor, socialite (died 1986 in France)
 July 8 – James B. Wilson, American footballer (died 1986)
 July 9 
 Thomas Barlow, basketball player (died 1983)
 Cullen Landis, film actor and director (died 1975)
 July 13 – John Henry Cates, businessman and political figure (died 1986)
 July 18 
 Patrick O'Boyle, prelate (died 1987)
 Thelma Payne, diver (died 1988)
 July 19
 Percy Spencer, inventor of the microwave oven (died 1969)
 Stafford L. Warren, physician and radiologist, inventor of the mammogram (died 1981)
 July 21 
 Bourke B. Hickenlooper, U.S. Senator from Iowa from 1945 to 1969 (died 1971)
 Gladys Hulette, actress (died 1991)  
 July 28 – Barbara La Marr, born Reatha Dale Watson, silent film actress (died 1926)
 August 22 – W. E. Lawrence, American actor (died 1947) 
 August 26 – Besse Cooper, supercentenarian (died 2012)
 September 8 – Howard Dietz, lyricist (died 1983)
 September 10 – Adele Astaire, dancer and singer (died 1981)
 September 21 – Walter Breuning, supercentenarian; last known surviving male born in 1896 (died 2011) 
 September 24 – F. Scott Fitzgerald, author known for the novel The Great Gatsby (died 1940)
 September 29 – George H. Bender, U.S. Senator from Ohio from 1954 to 1957 (died 1961)
 October 22 – Earle C. Clements, U.S. Senator from Kentucky from 1950 to 1957 (died 1985)
 October 30 – Ruth Gordon, actress and screenwriter (died 1985)
 November 8 – Bucky Harris, baseball player (died 1977) 
 November 14 – Mamie Eisenhower, née Doud, First Lady of the United States as wife of Dwight D. Eisenhower (died 1979)
 November 25
 Priscilla Dean, silent film actress (died 1987)
 Jessie Royce Landis, actress (died 1972)
 Virgil Thomson, composer (died 1989)
 December 6 – Ira Gershwin, lyricist (died 1983)
 December 17 – Robert Francis Anthony Studds, admiral and engineer, fourth Director of the United States Coast and Geodetic Survey (died 1962)
 December 21 – Leroy Robertson, composer and educator (died 1971)
 Date unknown
John E. Yunker, North Dakota public servant and politician (died 1968)

Deaths 
 January 6 – Thomas W. Knox, author and journalist (born 1835)
 January 11 – George G. Wright, U.S. Senator from Iowa from 1871 to 1877 (born 1820)
 January 15 – Mathew B. Brady, pioneering photographer (born 1822)
 January 19 – Bernhard Gillam, political cartoonist (born 1856)
 February 7 – William Hayden English, politician (born 1822)
 February 22 – George D. Robinson, lawyer and politician, 34th Governor of Massachusetts (born 1834)
 February 23 – George Davis, Confederate States Senator from North Carolina, 4th and last Confederate States Attorney General (born 1820)
 February 25 – Joseph P. Fyffe, admiral (born 1832)
 March 19 – R. Edward Earll,  ichthyologist and museum curator (b. 1853)
 April 9 – Gustav Koerner, statesman (born 1809 in Frankfurt)
 April 19 – Arthur I. Boreman, U.S. Senator from West Virginia from 1869 to 1875 (born 1823)
 May 5 – Jacob Fjelde, sculptor (born 1855 in Norway)
 May 7 – Herman Webster Mudgett, alias H. H. Holmes, serial killer, executed (born 1861)
 May 11 – Henry Cuyler Bunner, novelist and poet (born 1855)
 May 13 – Nora Perry, poet, journalist and children's author (born 1831)
 May 31 – Homer V. M. Miller, U.S. Senator in Georgia from 1871 (born 1814)
 June 2 – Ozora P. Stearns, U.S. Senator from Minnesota in 1871 (born 1831)
 June 4 – Austin Corbin, president of Long Island Rail Road (born 1827)
 June 12 – Thomas P. Leathers, steamboat captain (born 1816)
 June 13 – Alpheus Felch, 5th Governor of Michigan from 1846 till 1847 and U.S. Senator from Michigan from 1847 to 1853 (born 1804)
 June 25 – Lyman Trumbull, U.S. Senator from Illinois from 1855 to 1873 (born 1813)
 July 1 – Harriet Beecher Stowe, abolitionist and author best known for the novel Uncle Tom's Cabin (born 1811)
 July 14 – Luther Whiting Mason, music educator (born 1818)
 July 19 – Abraham H. Cannon, Mormon apostle (born 1859)
 July 22 – George Wallace Jones, U.S. Senator from Iowa from 1848 till 1859 (born 1804)
 August 9 – Alonzo J. Edgerton, U.S. Senator from Minnesota in 1881 (born 1827)
 August 14 – Olin Levi Warner, sculptor (born 1844)
 August 17 – Mary Abigail Dodge (Gail Hamilton), essayist (born 1833)
 October 13 – Thomas W. Ferry, U.S. Senator from Michigan from 1871 till 1883 (born 1827)
 October 23 – Columbus Delano, statesman (born 1809)
 November 22 – George Washington Gale Ferris Jr., inventor of the Ferris wheel, typhoid (born 1859)
 Date unknown – Asahel C. Beckwith, U.S. Senator from Wyoming in 1893 (born 1827)

See also
 List of American films of the 1890s
 Timeline of United States history (1860–1899)

References

External links
 

 
1890s in the United States
United States
United States
Years of the 19th century in the United States